This page shows the progress of Morecambe F.C. in the 2010–11 football season. This year they play their games in League Two in the English league system. This would be Morecambe's fourth season in the Football League and their first playing at home at the newly built Globe Arena.

Results

League data

League table

Results summary

Results by round

Appearances and goals
As of 6 May 2011.
(Substitute appearances in brackets)

Awards

Transfers

References

Morecambe F.C. seasons
Morecambe